Austin Dewing (born December 30, 1996) is an American soccer player. He is an officer in the United States Air Force.

Career

College
Dewing played college soccer at the United States Air Force Academy between 2015 and 2018. While with the Falcons, Dewing made 78 appearances, scoring 29 goals and tallying 19 assists.

While at college, Dewing also appeared for USL PDL team Colorado Pride Switchbacks U23 during their 2018 season.

Professional
On June 14, 2019, Dewing joined USL Championship side Colorado Springs Switchbacks. On May 21, 2021, it was announced that Dewing had been reassigned by the U.S. Air Force, and would leave the club to complete his training as a pilot.

References

External links

1996 births
Living people
American soccer players
Association football forwards
Air Force Falcons men's soccer players
Colorado Springs Switchbacks FC players
Soccer players from Colorado
USL League Two players
USL Championship players
Sportspeople from Colorado Springs, Colorado
United States Air Force officers
Military personnel from Colorado